Stewart Carson (born 12 June 1976) is a retired badminton player from South Africa. He was part of the national team that won the gold medal at the 2002 and 2004 African Championships, also at the 2003 All-Africa Games. Carson competed in badminton at the 2004 Summer Olympics in men's doubles with partner Dorian James. They were defeated in the round of 32 by Howard Bach and Kevin Han of the United States. He is currently the National Badminton Coach of South Africa.

Achievements

All-Africa Games 
Mixed doubles

African Championships 
Men's doubles

IBF International 
Men's singles

Men's doubles

Mixed doubles

External links 
 
 
 
 

1976 births
Living people
Sportspeople from Irvine, North Ayrshire
South African male badminton players
Badminton players at the 2004 Summer Olympics
Olympic badminton players of South Africa
Competitors at the 2003 All-Africa Games
African Games gold medalists for South Africa
African Games silver medalists for South Africa
African Games medalists in badminton